Derek Anderson may refer to:

Derek Anderson (American football) (born 1983), American football quarterback
Derek Anderson (basketball) (born 1974), basketball player
Derek Anderson (footballer) (born 1972), Scottish football (soccer) player
 Derek Anderson (fighter) (born 1990), American mixed martial artist